Endre Tilli (15 August 1922 – 14 August 1958) was a Hungarian fencer. He won a bronze medal in the team foil events at the 1952 and 1956 Summer Olympics. He died aboard KLM Flight 607-E in 1958.

References

External links
 

1922 births
1958 deaths
Hungarian male foil fencers
Olympic fencers of Hungary
Fencers at the 1952 Summer Olympics
Fencers at the 1956 Summer Olympics
Olympic bronze medalists for Hungary
Olympic medalists in fencing
Martial artists from Budapest
Medalists at the 1952 Summer Olympics
Medalists at the 1956 Summer Olympics
Victims of aviation accidents or incidents in international waters
Victims of aviation accidents or incidents in 1958